Milan Masonic Lodge No. 31 is a historic Masonic lodge located at Milan, Ripley County, Indiana.  It was built in 1900, and is a two-story, brick building with modest Romanesque Revival and Queen Anne style design elements.  It features elliptical and round-arched openings, a steeply pitched gable roof, pyramidal tower, stained glass windows, and wood detailing in the gable ends.  It is the oldest continuously active Masonic Lodges in Ripley County.

It was added to the National Register of Historic Places in 2013.

References

Clubhouses on the National Register of Historic Places in Indiana
Romanesque Revival architecture in Indiana
Queen Anne architecture in Indiana
Masonic buildings completed in 1900
Buildings and structures in Ripley County, Indiana
National Register of Historic Places in Ripley County, Indiana